Matthias Bachinger was the defending champion but chose not to defend his title.

Maverick Banes won the title after defeating Nam Ji-sung 6–3, 4–6, 6–4 in the final.

Seeds

Draw

Finals

Top half

Bottom half

References
Main Draw
Qualifying Draw

Gwangju Open - Singles
Gwangju Open